"Blame It on the Mistletoe" is a song by British singer and songwriter Ella Henderson and American singer-songwriter and musician AJ Mitchell. It was released as a digital download and for streaming on 4 December 2020 through Asylum Records. The song was written by  Henderson, Jez Ashurst, Julie Frost and Tre Jean-Marie.

Background
On her social media accounts, Henderson said, "What a whirlwind of a year 2020 has been... it's been a rollercoaster of life lessons & emotions for me... but a year I certainly won't ever forget! I hope everyone stays safe & well this Xmas time!! ... & make sure you stick my new Christmas tune on when your having a cheeky bevy or two this December."

Personnel
Credits adapted from Tidal.
 Jez Ashurst – producer, composer, bass, drums, guitar, piano, programmer, reco-reco, strings, synthesizer
 Tre Jean-Marie – producer, composer, backing vocals, bass, drums, guitar, mixer, piano, programmer, strings, synthesizer
 Gabriella Henderson – composer, vocals
 Julie Frost – composer
 Niamh Murphy – backing vocals
 David Emery – mastering
 AJ Mitchell – vocals

Charts

References

2020 singles
2020 songs
Ella Henderson songs
Songs written by Ella Henderson
AJ Mitchell songs
Songs written by Tre Jean-Marie